Edward Olivares (born March 6, 1996) is a Venezuelan professional baseball outfielder for the Kansas City Royals of Major League Baseball (MLB). He previously played for the San Diego Padres.

Career

Toronto Blue Jays

Olivares was signed by the Toronto Blue Jays as an international free agent on July 2, 2014. He made his professional debut in 2014 with the DSL Blue Jays, hitting .314/.436/.414/.850 with 1 home run and 22 RBI. He played for the Gulf Coast Blue Jays in 2015, hitting .198/.345/.362/.707 with 3 home runs and 10 RBI. In 2016, he played just 15 game for the Bluefield Blue Jays, hitting .273/.339/.418/.757 with 1 home run and 6 RBI. He split the 2017 season between the Lansing Lugnuts and the Dunedin Blue Jays, hitting a combined .269/.327/.468/.795 with 17 home runs and 72 RBI.

San Diego Padres
On January 6, 2018, Olivares and Jared Carkuff were traded to the San Diego Padres in exchange for Yangervis Solarte. He spent the 2018 season with the Lake Elsinore Storm, hitting .277/.321/.429/.750 with 12 home runs and 62 RBI. After the season, The Padres added him to their 40-man roster.

In 2019, Olivares spent the season with the Amarillo Sod Poodles, slashing .283/.349/.453 with 18 home runs, 77 RBIs, and 35 stolen bases over 127 games.

Olivares made his major league debut on July 25, 2020 against the Arizona Diamondbacks, hitting a double over 3 at-bats.

Kansas City Royals
On August 29, 2020, the Padres traded Olivares and a player to be named later to the Kansas City Royals, in exchange for relief pitcher Trevor Rosenthal. Overall with the 2020 Kansas City Royals, Olivares batted .274 with two home runs and 7 RBIs in 18 games.

Olivares began the 2021 season in Triple-A with the Omaha Storm Chasers. He was shuttled back and forth between Triple-A and the Royals throughout the season. He appeared in 39 games for the Royals, slashing .238/.291/.406 with 5 home runs, 12 RBI, and 2 stolen bases.

On August 4, 2022, Olivares was placed on the 60-day injured list with a left quadriceps strain.

References

External links

1996 births
Living people
Amarillo Sod Poodles players
Bluefield Blue Jays players
Dominican Summer League Blue Jays players
Dunedin Blue Jays players
Gulf Coast Blue Jays players
Kansas City Royals players
Lake Elsinore Storm players
Lansing Lugnuts players
Major League Baseball players from Venezuela
Major League Baseball outfielders
Omaha Storm Chasers players
San Diego Padres players
Baseball players from Caracas
Tigres de Aragua players
Venezuelan expatriate baseball players in the United States
Venezuelan expatriate baseball players in the Dominican Republic